FFK (เฟย์ ฟาง แก้ว) is a Thai pop trio girl group consisting of 3 members; Faye, Fang and Kaew, formed in 2007, affiliated with Kamikaze music, a sublabel of RS Music Company. They are the first artists of this teenager-hit music label, representing 3 styles of girls in this generation: fashionista, sweet and cool, different but perfect.
 
FFK released many hit string songs that have topped the Thai radio & music video charts. Many impressive shows and performances on the stages, lovely personalities and looks in front and behind the scenes, made them become one of the most popular girl groups or idols of this age. In addition to their music career, they have other roles such as being emcees on TV Programs: Kamikaze Club, FFK OPEN WORLD and Lady First, as well as acting in Thai dramas, movies and musical play. They frequently participate in special projects like Kamikaze music, Faye in Seven Days and Fang&Kaew in Love Project.

From their song, Baby Boy, the lyrics "Baby Boy, I'm not your toy" inspired FFK to name their official fanclub "TOY". Their fans chose to name themselves as FFK's "TOY" with it holding a second meaning of being missed (Thinking of You).

In 2015 FFK has graduated from Kamikaze Music to Yes! Music, another sublabel of RS music company.

And in 2019 FFK have a comeback song Love track (เพลงพาไป) as independent artists.

Members 

 Pornpawee "Faye" Neerasingh (พรปวีณ์  นีระสิงห์)
 Dhanundhorn "Fang" Neerasingh (ธนันต์ธรญ์  นีระสิงห์)
 Jarinya "Kaew" Sirimongkolsakul (จริญญา  ศิริมงคลสกุล)

Filmography & Dramas & Musical

Discography

Albums 
 (2007) FFK
Tracks
 Na Krab Na Krab นะครับ นะคร๊าบ
 MSN(^_^)
 Yung Pen Dok Mai Kong Ter Yu Rur Plao (Flower?) ยังเป็นดอกไม้ของเธออยู่หรือเปล่า
 Kor Bok Pai Laew Nee Na (Say What You mean) ก็บอกไปแล้วนี่นา
 Klang Ngon Tha Ruk Kan Yorm Charn Na Tur แกล้งงอน ถ้ารักกัน ยอมฉันนะเธอ
 Yaak Pen Kae Nong Sao (Younger Sister) อยากเป็นแค่น้องสาว
 (2008) Miz U 2
Tracks
 Miz Call Miz U
 Kum Tham (My Question) คำถาม
 Phom Ruk Khun (I Luv U) ผมรักคุณ
 Dai Tung Nun (Everything for you) ได้ทั้งนั้น
 Dek Deur (Your Stubborn Love) เด็กดื้อ
 (2009) POPparazzi
Tracks
 Help Me Please
 Ya Hai Kwam Wang (Love Fool) อย่าให้ความหวัง
 Fan Kon Neung (Your Girl) แฟนคนนึง
 Kwan Ruk (Love) ความรัก
 Keun Yhoo Tee Ter (Up 2 U) ขึ้นอยู่ที่เธอ
 Yhom Pen Puen Ter (Friend Or Nothing) ยอมเป็นเพื่อนเธอ
 Wang Plao (R U Busy) ว่างป่าว
 Kao Rur (Rumor) ข่าวลือ
 Top Friend
 Khob Khun Tee Hai Chun Dai Ruk Ter (Thanks 4 U) ขอบคุณที่ให้ฉันได้รักเธอ
 (2010) Ladies & Gentlemen
Tracks
 Baby Boy
 Mai Chai Id Cha (Jealous) ไม่ใช่อิจฉา
 Yaak Luem Wa Pen Puen Ter (Blank) อยากลืมว่าเป็นเพื่อนเธอ
 Kid Sun (Deeper) คิดสั้น
 Lhong Thang (Blinded) หลงทาง
 Chun Kleid Ter (Hate U) ฉันเกลียดเธอ
 Mai Kid Tae Ru Seik (Maybe) ไม่คิดแต่รู้สึก
 Dee Kwa Na (Boy Friend) ดีกว่านะ
 Sun Ya (Promise) สัญญา
 Mai Chai Id Cha ไม่ใช่อิจฉา (Acoustic Version)
 (2012) FFKAHOLIC
Tracks
 Loveaholic เลิฟอะฮอลิก
 Tam Mai Kid (Silly Question) ถามไม่คิด
 Lerk Kun Na (Enough) เลิกกันนะ
 (2013) FFK Girl's Topic
Tracks
 Mouth to Mouth เม้าท์ทูเม้าท์
 Mee Sith Jeb Theung Mue Rai (In The End) มีสิทธิ์เจ็บถึงเมื่อไหร่
 Ying (Peacock) หยิ่ง
(2015)
Track
 Ruk Yar Bohn (Primetime) รักอย่าบ่น

Seven Days 
 (2009) Seven Days
 Ruk Plae Wha Ruk Rue Ploa รักแปลว่ารักหรือเปล่า (Faye)

Original Soundtrack 
 (2011) Bangkok Kung Fu
 War Whun ว้าวุ่น (Kaew)
 Khor Kuen ขอคืน (Kaew)
 (2014) TV Show : Kami Tid Mun
 Fhuek Kub Phi Dai Mhai ฝึกกับพี่ได้ไหม (FFK feat. Poppy K-OTIC)

Ost. 
 Dramas : Daddy Duo Khun Por Jom Fiew (คุณพ่อจอมเฟี้ยว)
 Songs : Faen Khon Nueng Your Girl (Feat. Tomo K-otic) (แฟนคนนึง (Your Girl) (Feat. Tomo K-OTIC))
 Dramas : 2 Brothers (2 Brothers แผนลวงรักฉบับพี่ชาย)
 Songs : Rak Chan Maikhwam Wa Tur (รักฉันหมายความว่าเธอ) (Fang)
 Songs : Lomhaichai Khu Tur (ลมหายใจคือเธอ) (Fang)
 Dramas : Kao Waan Hai Noo Pen Sai Lub 2019 (เขาวานให้หนูเป็นสายลับ)
 Songs : (อะไรก็ลงที่ฉัน) (Kaew)
 Dramas : Why R U? (เพราะรักใช่เปล่า)
 Songs : (นี่คือรักใช่ไหม ( WHY R U ? ) - แก้ว x โทโมะ) (Kaew)
 Dramas : Nang Sao 18 Mongkut (นางสาว 18 มงกุฎ)
 Songs : Chur Dai Mai? X KACHA (เชื่อได้มั้ย?) 
 Dramas :
 Songs : 
 Dramas :
 Songs :

Kamikaze 
 (2007) Kud Jai ขัดใจ (Kamikaze Debut Song)
 (2008) Forward
 (2008) Pleng Ruk เพลงรัก
 (2008) Peuan Gun Chun Ruk Tur เพื่อนกันฉันรักเธอ
 (2010) Kamikaze Wave (with 2nd Generation of Kamikaze)
 (2011) Ruk Tur Tuk Wi Na Tee รักเธอ ทุกวินาที (Every Minute)
 (2011) Shi Ter ใช่เธอ (It's You) [Poppy K-OTIC + Fang FFK]
 (2011) Pern Tee Ter Mai Roo Jai เพื่อนที่เธอไม่รู้ใจ (Like a Maze) [Tome K-OTIC + Kaew FFK]
 (2011) Ruk Sam Rao รักสามเรา (Trilogy) [Gavin 3.2.1. + WAii + KnomJean]
 (2012) Ruk Tae Cha Tam Ha Ter รักแท้จะตามหาเธอ (Destiny)
 (2014) Ruk Gun Yar Bung Kub รักกันอย่าบังคับ (Dictator)
 (2014) 7 Pee Thi Ruk Thur 7ปีที่รักเธอ

Concerts 
 (2009) Kamikaze Girl Live in Bangkok
 (2009) 1-2-Call Freedom Zheza Zim Presents Kamikaze Live Concert
 (2009) PONDS Presents มันส์..น่านัก (Muns Nar Nuk) Concert
 (2009) Big Max RS @ Smallroom The Music คั่น Concert
 (2010) Kamikaze Wave Concert 2010
 (2010) The Idol Battle Concert (Guest-Kaew)
 (2010) The Seed Show : วัน Boys Show (Guest)
 (2010) Faye Fang Kaew Ladies & Gentlemen Debutante Concert
 (2011) Toa Kae Noi Presents K-OTIC The Real Time Concert (Guest)
 (2011) Hiruscar Postacne Presents KamiKaze LOVEเว่อร์ Concert
 (2011) The 3rd Big Mountain Music Festival
 (2012) Biscuit Gap Presents FFKAHOLIC Concert
 (2012) AIS 1-2-Call Presents Kamikaze the 5th Destiny Concert
 (2013) AIS 3G 1-2-Call Presents Kamikaze K Fight Concert
 (2014) AIS 3G 1-2-Call Presents Kamikaze แดนซ์เนรมิต (Dance Neramit) Concert

TV Programmes 
 (2009-2012) Kamikaze Club : FFK
 (2011)      Daddy's meals (Kub Khoa Khong Pau) : Faye, Fang
 (2011-2012) FFK Open World : FFK
 (2013)      Lady First : FFK

Awards 
 (2009) POP Music Award : Top Download (KAMIKAZE - Puean Gun Chun Ruk Tur)
 (2009) Channel [V] Awards : Best Group
 (2009) Vergin GreetZ Awards : GreetZ Korea (Thai artist that looks "Korea" but is loved by Thai ppl) 
 (2009) Audition Music Awards : Best New Artist (Seven Days)
 (2011) Mthai Top Talk-About 2011 : Mthai Top Talk-About Artists
 (2011) Kazz Awards : Popular Group
 (2011) Kazz Awards : Best Concert
 (2012) Playpark Music Awards : Hittest Song (Loveaholic)
 (2012) Seventeen Choice Awards : Seventeen Choice Music Group Artist

References

External links 

 FFK Official Site
 FFK&KAMIKAZE Official Site

Thai girl groups
Musical groups from Bangkok